Hebeloma victoriense is a species of mushroom in the family Hymenogastraceae. Originally described in 1983 based on specimens collected from Victoria, Australia, it is also found in New Zealand.

See also
List of Hebeloma species

References

victoriense
Fungi described in 1983
Fungi native to Australia
Fungi of New Zealand